General elections were held in Namibia on 15 and 16 November 2004 to elect the President and National Assembly. The National Assembly election resulted in a landslide win for SWAPO, which won 55 of the 78 seats with over 75% of the vote. SWAPO's candidate for president, Hifikepunye Pohamba, won the presidential election. Following his victory, Pohamba was sworn in as President on 21 March 2005 at Independence Stadium in Windhoek.

Results

President

National Assembly

By region

References

Presidential elections in Namibia
Namibia
Parliamentary
Elections in Namibia
National Assembly (Namibia)
Namibia